The Frank Bird Linderman House is a site on the National Register of Historic Places located in Lake County, Montana.  It was added to the Register on February 22, 1984.

Presumably it includes a house of Frank Bird Linderman.

Linderman is known to have owned property at Goose Bay on Flathead Lake (which is in Lake County and Flathead County), to which he moved his family from Helena, where he wrote full-time.

References

Houses in Lake County, Montana
Houses completed in 1917
Houses on the National Register of Historic Places in Montana
National Register of Historic Places in Lake County, Montana
1917 establishments in Montana